Indian Air Force: A Cut Above is the official free air combat mobile gaming application of the Indian Air Force first released on 31 May 2019. It was officially launched on 31 July 2019 by the Air Chief Marshal B. S. Dhanoa for Android and iOS. In November 2019 Google picked the game to be part of the Best Game 2019 awards (in the 'Users Choice Game' category). The Vice Chief of Air Staff Air Marshal Harjit Singh Arora released the multiplayer version of the game.

The game has three training levels where the user is taught the various intricacies of the game such as taking off, landing gear operations, air-control, target hitting and various other things. The game features a character similar to Abhinandan Varthaman's featuring his gunslinger mustache, however customization is possible. The game has three difficulty levels. The game allows the user to control a variety of the IAFs arsenal including the MI-17 V5 helicopter, the Mirage 2000 and four other aircraft as well as the Rafale. The controls however have been described as "clunky" and gameplay has been compared to the "arcade style of simulation found in games like Ace Combat and Tom Clancy’s H.A.W.X.".

The game, as explained in the information section of Google Play Store, "allows IAF aspirants to experience first hand the roles of an air warrior, as well as means to apply and appear for recruitment from the comfort of a mobile phone". An IAF spokesperson reiterated this saying that "the primary aim of this game is to get youth attracted to the profession of military aviation, while providing information about career options in the Indian Air Force."

A Cut Above is a follow-up to the 2014 game called Guardians of the Skies which was also produced by the IAF. Guardians of the Skies had won various awards such as "Best mobile application (game) in 2014 from Microsoft India" and was also awarded by Unity3D. Threye, a Delhi-based game development studio, won the contract from the Air Force from a bid of over 120 participants in 2013.

References

External links 

 Indian Air Force - A Cut Above on Google Play
 Indian Air Force - A Cut Above on App Store (iOS)
 How the Indian Air Force got its game - Guardian of the Skies - Threye

2019 video games
Android (operating system) games
Combat flight simulators
IOS games
Indian Air Force
Video games developed in India